Arthur William Weightman (1 May 1910 – 1979) was an English footballer who played for Mansfield Town and Torquay United.

References

1910 births
1979 deaths
English footballers
Association football midfielders
English Football League players
Mansfield Town F.C. players
Sportspeople from Newark-on-Trent
Footballers from Nottinghamshire
Newark Town F.C. players
Torquay United F.C. players
Tunbridge Wells F.C. players